Caraluna ("Moonface") is the second studio album recorded by Bacilos released on July 16, 2002. The album won the Latin Grammy Award for Best Pop Album by a Duo or Group with Vocals in 2003.

Track listing
This information adapted from Allmusic.

Charts

References

2002 albums
Bacilos albums
Spanish-language albums
Latin Grammy Award for Best Pop Album by a Duo or Group with Vocals
Grammy Award for Best Latin Pop Album
Albums produced by Sergio George